Hyalinobatrachium talamancae is a species of frog in the family Centrolenidae. It is endemic to the Limón Province, Costa Rica. Its common name is Talamanca glass frog.
Its natural habitats are premontane wet forests. It is a regularly seen frog in suitable habitat.

References

talamancae
Endemic fauna of Costa Rica
Amphibians of Costa Rica
Amphibians described in 1952
Taxonomy articles created by Polbot